Salaputium is a genus of  saltwater clams, marine bivalve molluscs in the family Crassatellidae of the order Carditida.

Species
 † Salaputium aldingensis Finlay, 1930 
 Salaputium discus (Hedley, 1907)
 Salaputium fulvidum (Angas, 1871)
 Salaputium iredalei Powell, 1958
 Salaputium janus (Hedley, 1906)
 † Salaputium martini Finlay, 1927 
 Salaputium micrum (Verco, 1895)
 Salaputium probleemum (Verco, 1907)
 Salaputium productum (Verco, 1895)
 Salaputium rhomboides (E. A. Smith, 1885)
 Salaputium scabriliratum (Hedley, 1902)
 Salaputium securiforme (Hedley, 1902)
 Salaputium sublamellatum (Kobelt, 1885)
 † Salaputium tinopaica Laws, 1939
Synonyms
 Salaputium dakarense (Cosel, 1995): synonym of Crassatina dakarensis Cosel, 1995
 Salaputium modestum (H. Adams, 1869): synonym of Crassatina modesta (H. Adams, 1869)
 Salaputium unicum Hayami & Kase, 1993: synonym of Salaputium sublamellatum (Kobelt, 1885)

References

External links
 Iredale, T. (1924). Results from Roy Bell's molluscan collections. Proceedings of the Linnean Society of New South Wales. 49(3): 179-278

Crassatellidae
Bivalve genera